Malasar (Tamil : மலைசர்) are a designated Scheduled Tribe in the Indian states of  Kerala and Tamil Nadu. The Malasar are one of the earliest known inhabitants of the Western Ghats, in Anaimalai Hills. Malasar is an unclassified Southern Dravidian language spoken by a Scheduled tribe of India.

References

Caste system in India
 
Adivasi